The Order of the Dannebrog is a Danish order of chivalry instituted in 1671 by Christian V. Until 1808, membership in the Order was limited to fifty members of noble or royal rank, who formed a single class known as White Knights to distinguish them from the Blue Knights who were members of the Order of the Elephant. In 1808, the Order was reformed and divided into four classes. The statute of the Order was amended in 1951 by a Royal Ordinance so that both men and women could be members of the Order. Today, the Order of the Dannebrog is a means of honouring and rewarding the faithful servants of the modern Danish state for meritorious civil or military service, for a particular contribution to the arts, sciences or business life, or for working for Danish interests.

Insignia
The badge of the Order is a white enamelled Dannebrog cross (i.e., a cross pattée, the lower arm being longer than the others) with a red enamelled border, for the Knights in silver, and for everyone else in gold or silver gilt. At the top of this cross is the royal cypher of the bestowing monarch, crowned with the distinctive Danish royal crown On its front, the cross bears the royal cyphers of Christian V at its centre, as well as the motto of the Order:  (God and the King) on its arms. On its reverse are found the crowned royal cyphers of Valdemar II Sejr, Christian V and Frederik VI, as well as the years 1219, 1671 and 1808, the years that each of them ascended the Danish throne. In each of the four angles of the cross is found a small Danish royal crown.

The collar of the Order is made of gold, with small enamelled Dannebrog crosses alternating with alternating crowned royal cyphers representing Kings Valdemar II Sejr and Christian V, the reputed and actual founders of the Order.  When the collar is worn the sash is not worn.

The star of the Order is an eight-pointed silver star with straight rays with an enamelled Dannebrog cross (similar to the front of the badge but without the royal cypher above and the royal crowns between the arms of the cross) at the centre.

The breast cross of the Order is similar to the cross on the star but larger and with faceted silver instead of white enamel and without the silver rays of the star.

The ribbon of the Order is white silk moiré with red borders, the national colours of Denmark.

The Order originally had a distinctive habit worn by the knights (after 1808, by the Knights Grand Cross) on very solemn occasions.  The habit consisted of a white doublet, white breeches, white stockings and white shoes, over which was worn a red mantle with a white lining and with the star of the order embroidered in silver on its left side.  Over this red mantle was worn a short white shoulder cape with a standing collar embroidered in gold, upon which was worn the collar of the Order (the habit was always worn with the collar and never with the ribbon of the Order).  The habit also had a black hat with a plume of white and red ostrich feathers.  This habit was almost identical to that worn by the knights of the Order of the Elephant.

Grades
The Order is divided into six grades, which are grouped into four classes:
 Special class
Grand Commander — wears the badge with diamonds on a necklet (gentlemen) or on a bow (ladies), plus the star on the left chest;
 First Order class
Grand Cross — wears the badge on a collar or on a sash on the right shoulder, plus the star on the left chest;
 Second Order class
Commander 1st Class — wears the breast cross on the left chest, plus (for gentlemen) the badge on a neck ribbon;
Commander — wears the badge on a neck ribbon (gentlemen) or on a bow (ladies);
 Third Order class
Knight 1st Class — wears the badge on a ribbon (gentlemen) or on a bow (ladies) with rosette on the left chest;
Knight — wears the badge on a ribbon (gentlemen) or on a bow (ladies) on the left chest.

The Grand Commander grade is reserved for persons of princely origin. It is awarded only to royalty with close family ties to the Danish Royal House. The Grand Cross grade can, as a special honor, be awarded 'with diamonds' (S.K.i diam., short for ). The Order also has a related decoration, known as the Cross of Honour (D.Ht., short for ). The insignia of the Order must be returned upon the death of the holder.

Order of wear

Cross of Honour
The Dannebrogordenens Hæderstegn (Cross of Honour of the Order of the Dannebrog) in modern times is only awarded to Danes on whom the Order of the Dannebrog has already been bestowed. It is also worn by members of the Danish royal family. Its badge is similar to the badge of the Order, but all in silver. It is worn on a ribbon (by gentlemen) or bow (by ladies), with rosette, on the left chest.

Recipients

Each Danish ministry has a quota of Knights and Knights 1st class that they may use at their discretion. It is most often given to high-ranking officers of the police, armed forces and emergency services.

Also used for politicians in Folketinget after 8 years of elected service. Ministers are given the rank of Knight 1st Class.

The rank of Commander is given to colonels, ministers and other high-ranking officials as a retirement-decoration after long service. Commander 1st class is given for admirals, generals, Supreme-court judges, ambassadors, and other governmental leaders as a retirement decoration.

The Grand Cross is most often used for admirals, generals, Supreme-court judges, ambassadors and similar as a reward for very meritorious service to Denmark.

Grand Cross with Breaststar with Diamonds is most often given to high-ranking officers of the Royal Court, such as Hofmarskals.

Finally, the Grand Commander grade is given only to 8 people. The reigning monarch is always a Grand Commander, and he/she may give the grade to 7 others, most often close family.

Diplomatic use
Award of the Order of the Dannebrog is often used as a tool of diplomacy. If a foreign country has an Order that they give to foreign diplomats in their country, then their diplomats in Denmark can be given an Order of the Dannebrog. To be eligible, the foreign ambassador must reside in Denmark for at least three years.

Grand Commanders

 Her Majesty Margrethe II, Queen of Denmark, Master of the Order (14 January 1972)
 His Majesty Carl XVI Gustaf, King of Sweden (10 October 1975)
 His Majesty Harald V, King of Norway (28 October 1991)
 Her Royal Highness Benedikte, Princess of Denmark (27 January 1993)
 His Royal Highness Frederik, Crown Prince of Denmark (1 January 2004)
 His Royal Highness Joachim, Prince of Denmark (16 April 2004)

With the deaths of Prince Henrik of Denmark in 2018, and King Constantine II of Greece in 2023, two Grand Commander positions are available. The number of Grand Commanders never exceed 8.

Revocation
It is possible for membership in the Order to be revoked. Before 1808, membership had only been revoked on two occasions – Peder Griffenfeld who was charged with treason, and Samuel Christoph von Plessen who was charged with looting and gross misconduct. In more recent times, it has been revoked on the basis of criminality, such as Peter Adler Alberti (1910), Erik Ninn-Hansen (1995), and Peter Brixtofte (2008). Foreigners have also had their membership revoked. Several prominent Nazi officials, such as Hermann Göring and Konstantin von Neurath, were awarded the Order, but it was later revoked.

Jewelers and goldsmiths 

Below is a list of jewelers who have made the insignia for the Order:

Anton Michelsen was made a part of Royal Copenhagen A/S, which is now the supplier.

Gallery

See also
 List of Grand Commanders of the Dannebrog
 Dannebrogordenens Hæderstegn
 List of orders, decorations, and medals of the Kingdom of Denmark
 Order of the Elephant
 Order of the British Empire, roughly equivalent British honour

Notes

References

 
1671 establishments in Denmark
Dannebrog, Order of the
Dannebrog, Order of the
Orders, decorations, and medals of Denmark